Alex Smith MBE (born 25 December 1939) is a Scottish former football player and manager. His major achievements over close to five decades as a manager include winning the Scottish Cup in 1987 with St Mirren and 1990 with Aberdeen, where he also won the Scottish League Cup in 1989. He had a role in the development of many prominent players, and the 2005 book on Scottish football, The Final Whistle? was described as "the nearest thing the Scottish game has to a father figure".

Biography
Smith was born in Cowie, a mining village close to Stirling, and played in the same youth team as Billy Bremner. He was best man at Bremner's wedding. His playing career was journeymanlike, and he played for Kilmarnock, Stenhousemuir, Stirling Albion and Albion Rovers.

His managerial career began in 1968 with Stenhousemuir. In 1974, he became manager of Stirling Albion and would manage the club for 12 years, winning the Second Division championship in 1977. Stirling Albion remained in the second tier for four seasons, and were relegated in 1981 after failing to score a league goal for three months; Smith nonetheless remained at the club until 1986 when he moved to St Mirren, with whom he won the Scottish Cup in 1987, overcoming that season's UEFA Cup finalists Dundee United with a young, all-Scottish team in a surprise result which endured as one of the Paisley club's most treasured achievements.

Smith and co-manager Jocky Scott succeeded Ian Porterfield at Aberdeen in 1988. For the next three seasons the Dons were the main rivals to Rangers, finishing runners-up in each of those seasons. New players were brought in, several from Dutch football including Theo Snelders and Hans Gillhaus, along with youth prospects such as Eoin Jess and Stephen Wright. In 1989–90 Aberdeen won the double of the League Cup (beating Rangers after losing to them the previous year) and Scottish Cup (in a penalty shootout against Celtic), and in 1990–91 went into their final game at Ibrox needing only a draw to win the Scottish Premier Division championship on goals scored; a 2–0 defeat courtesy of a Mark Hateley brace sealed a third straight title for Rangers. Aberdeen began the next season well, including a win at Ibrox, but early exits from the League Cup and UEFA Cup followed; Scott left in September 1991 to take over at Dunfermline Athletic, and a further slump in form resulted in Smith's dismissal in February 1992.

Smith would later manage Clyde, Dundee United and Ross County. He later worked as technical director at Falkirk. In June 2009 he was appointed assistant to the then head coach Eddie May. In March 2013 he was appointed interim manager at the club following the departure of Steven Pressley. He was again placed in interim charge in September 2017, after Peter Houston left. Smith was 77 years old, which made him the oldest manager of a professional football club in Europe at the time.

Smith was involved with Scotland at a number of levels, managing the U18 and U21 sides. He also took charge of the Scotland B squad in January 2007, alongside Bobby Williamson.

He retired from football at the end of the 2017–18 season to emigrate to Australia with his wife.

Smith was appointed Member of the Order of the British Empire (MBE) in the 2005 Birthday Honours for services to sport in Scotland.

Managerial statistics

Honours

Player
Stirling Albion
 Scottish Division Two: 1964–65

Manager
Stenhousemuir
 Stirlingshire Cup: 1970–71

Stirling Albion
 Scottish Second Division: 1976–77
 Stirlingshire Cup: 1976–77, 1977–78, 1983–84

St Mirren
 Scottish Cup: 1986–87

Aberdeen
(co-manager with Jocky Scott)
 Scottish Cup: 1989–90
 Scottish League Cup: 1989–90
Runners-up: 1988–89
 Aberdeenshire Cup: 1989–90,1990–91

Clyde
 Scottish Second Division: 1992–93

Springfield United
 Australia - FQPL5 Metro Premiership: 2022
 Australia - FQPL5 Metro Grand Final: 2022
 Australia - SUFC Cup: 2021, 2022

Individual
 SPL Manager of the Month: March 2001, May 2001, January 2002

References

 Reid, Harry (2005), The Final Whistle?, Birlinn, 
 Grant, Michael and Robertson, Rob (2010), The Management, Birlinn, 

1939 births
Living people
Footballers from Stirling
Scottish football managers
Scottish footballers
St Mirren F.C. managers
Aberdeen F.C. managers
Dundee United F.C. managers
Members of the Order of the British Empire
Clyde F.C. managers
Stirling Albion F.C. managers
Stenhousemuir F.C. managers
Ross County F.C. managers
Kilmarnock F.C. players
Stenhousemuir F.C. players
Stirling Albion F.C. players
East Stirlingshire F.C. players
Albion Rovers F.C. players
Scottish Premier League managers
Scottish Football League managers
Association football inside forwards
Falkirk F.C. non-playing staff
Scottish Football League players
Scotland national under-21 football team managers
Scottish Football Hall of Fame inductees